Nihal Meshref (born December 24, 1970, is an Egyptian table tennis player. She represented Egypt in 1988 and 1992 Summer Olympics, where she competed in women's singles event at table tennis competition.

Olympic participation

Seoul 1988

Group G

Final Standing: 41T

Barcelona 1992

Group L

Final Standing: 33T

References

1970 births
Living people
Egyptian female table tennis players
Table tennis players at the 1988 Summer Olympics
Table tennis players at the 1992 Summer Olympics
Olympic table tennis players of Egypt